Kontinent was an émigré dissident journal which focused on the politics of the Soviet Union and its satellites. Founded in 1974 by writer Vladimir Maximov, its first editor-in-chief, it was published in German and Russian and later translated into English. A Norwegian edition, Kontinent Skandinavia, was published from 1979 to 1981.

Its Editorial Board included Raymond Aron, George Bailey, Saul Bellow, Józef Czapski, Robert Conquest, Milovan Djilas, Alexander Galich, Jerzy Giedroyc, Gustaw Herling-Grudzinski, Eugène Ionesco, Arthur Koestler, Naum Korzhavin, Mihajlo Mihajlov, Ludek Pachman, Andrei Sakharov, Alexander Schmemann, Zïnaida Schakovskoy, Wolf Siedler, Ignazio Silone, Strannik, and Carl-Gustav Ströhm.

This initial issue featured a debate between Andrei Sakharov and Aleksandr Solzhenitsyn regarding Solzhenitsyn's Letter to the Soviet Leaders.

Current status
Kontinent continues to be published in English and Russian by Russia House. Currently, the editorial is located at Moscow,
registered in the committee on the printed materials of the Russian federation, registration license є 014255. Kontinent follows traditions of scientific journals correcting errors indicated by readers. The Russian version has been available online since 1999.

See also
Kultura
Vidnova

Notes

External links
Issued of Kontinent available online

Further reading
 Vladimir E. Maximov, editor, Kontinent, Anchor Books (1976), trade paperback, 196 pages, 
 Vladimir E. Maximov, editor, Kontinent 2, Doubleday (1977), trade paperback, 

1974 establishments in France
Dissent
German-language magazines
Magazines established in 1974
Magazines published in Moscow
Russian-language magazines
Literary magazines published in Russia
Political magazines published in Russia